Papuascincus is a genus of skinks endemic to New Guinea.

Species
The following 4 species are recognized as being valid:

Papuascincus buergersi (T. Vogt, 1932)
Papuascincus morokanus (Parker, 1936)
Papuascincus phaeodes (T. Vogt, 1932)
Papuascincus stanleyanus (Boulenger, 1897)

Nota bene: A binomial authority in parentheses indicates that the species was originally described in a genus other than Papuascincus.

Papuascincus buergersi (T. Vogt, 1932) is a synonym of Emoia atrocostata (Lesson, 1830).

References

Further reading
Allison A, Greer AE (1986). "Egg shells with pustulate surface structures: basis for a new genus of New Guinea skinks (Lacertilia: Scincidae)". J. Herpetol. 20 (1): 116–119. (Papuascincus, new genus).

Papuascincus
Skinks of New Guinea
Lizard genera
Endemic fauna of New Guinea
Taxa named by Allen Allison
Taxa named by Allen Eddy Greer